Emmanuelle Wargon (née Stoléru; born 24 February 1971) is a French civil servant, politician and former lobbyist who served as Minister Delegate for Housing in the Castex government of President Emmanuel Macron from July 2020 to May 2022. 

Previously she served as Minister of Ecological Transition attached to the Minister for Ecological and Inclusive Transition, from 2018 to 2020, in the government of Prime Minister Édouard Philippe.

Early life and education
Wargon was born in Neuilly-sur-Seine on 24 February 1971, the only child of Lionel Stoléru (19372016), Secretary of State in the government of Michel Rocard under President François Mitterrand (19881991), and Francine Wolff (19442009) ENA graduate, Paris city administrator.

Emmanuelle Wargon went to secondary school at Lycée Molière in the 16th arrondissement of Paris, after completing her studies at HEC Paris in 1992, she entered Institut d'études politiques de Paris (popularly called Sciences Po), she then graduated from École nationale d'administration in the same promotion as future Prime Minister Édouard Philippe in 1997.

Career

Career in the public sector 
Wargon began her career in 1997 as an auditor attached to the Court of Audit, the administrative court charged with conducting financial and legislative audits of public institutions. In 2001, she joined the cabinet of Bernard Kouchner, then Minister of Health, as technical advisor. A year later, she became Deputy Director of the French Agency for the Safety of Health Products (Afssaps), an agency whose main mission was to assess health risks posed by pharmaceutical drug.

In 2010, Wargon was appointed secretary-general of the ministries responsible for social affairs (health, work, sport), then became general delegate for employment and vocational training (DGEFP) from 2012 to 2015, where she oversees the Youth Guarantee (mechanism for the integration of young dropouts), the reform of vocational training and the reform of social plans.

Career in the private sector 
Wargon joined Danone in 2015 as Managing Director in charge of corporate social responsibility (CSR), public affairs and communications. She coordinates Danone's commitments in the areas of health, the environment, and inclusion and is involved in issues of climate strategy and agricultural transition. It thus supports the company in transforming its relationship with society and the environment. In 2016 she became SVP of Corporate Affairs & Sustainability Integrator.

Political career 
On 16 October 2018, Wargon is appointed Secretary of State to the Minister of Ecological and Solidarity Transition François de Rugy in the second government of Prime minister Edouard Philippe.

Since July 2020, Wargon is serving as Minister Delegate for Housing, attached to the Minister for the Ecological Transition in the Castex government.

In May 2022, she was dismissed by the incoming Borne government.

Personal life
Wargon is married to Mathias Wargon, an A&E doctor. They have three children.

Awards
 2015 – Chevalier de l'ordre national du Mérite

See also
 Castex Government

Notes

References 

1971 births
Living people
HEC Paris alumni
Sciences Po alumni
École nationale d'administration alumni
Judges of the Court of Audit (France)
21st-century French women politicians
Women government ministers of France
People from Neuilly-sur-Seine
Politicians from Île-de-France
Knights of the Ordre national du Mérite